Olyra collettii is a species of longtail catfish. This species is possibly a junior synonym of Olyra longicaudata.

References
 

Bagridae
Fish of Asia
Fish described in 1881